Royal Dokmaideng Hotel is a hotel in Vientiane, Laos. It is located on Lanexang Avenue, not far south of Patuxai. Its royal restaurant is furnished classically and the Lobby Bar contains a piano. The hotel is operated by a Taiwanese firm.

References

Hotels in Vientiane